Carrie Rugh (born  1961) is an American former competitive figure skater. She is the 1976 Nebelhorn Trophy silver medalist, 1976 Grand Prix International St. Gervais bronze medalist, 1978 Richmond Trophy silver medalist, and 1979 U.S. national bronze medalist. She trained at the Los Angeles Figure Skating Club. The mayor of El Segundo, California proclaimed February 14, 1979 as "Carrie Rugh Day". After retiring from competition, she performed with the Ice Capades.

Rugh attended El Segundo High School.

Competitive highlights

References 

1960s births
American female single skaters
Living people
People from El Segundo, California
Sportspeople from California
El Segundo High School alumni
21st-century American women